Harman Mahala (in Bulgarian Харман махала) is the fourth largest Roma ghetto in Plovdiv, Bulgaria. It is located in the northern part of the city near the road to Karlovo.

It is the smallest living area of ethnic minority representatives, comprising around 2000 people.

References

Neighbourhoods in Plovdiv
Romani communities in Bulgaria